Ellis Andrew Stones (1 October 1895 – 9 April 1975) was an Australian landscape architect of private and public gardens—many displaying naturalistic rockwork—and a conservationist whose work and ideas influenced approaches to public landscaping in Australia. Based in Melbourne, Australia, he was an early proponent of the use of Australian native plants and one of the founding fathers of the Australian landscaping style.

Early years and family life

Ellis Stones was born in Wodonga, Victoria. His father was Thomas James Stones a customs officer, born in Victoria. His mother was Hannah May, née Downs, also born in Victoria. He grew up in Essendon, Victoria. After attending Moonee Ponds West Primary School he worked with the Victorian Railways as an apprentice carriage builder. He married Olive Doyle in 1922. They had a son who died in his first year, and three daughters.

War years (1914–1918 and 1939–1945)

On 25 April 1915 he was a rower in the first boat of the second wave of the landing in the Gallipoli Campaign. He took a bullet in his left knee, an injury which was to cause him lifelong pain.

During World War II Stones worked in the Volunteer Defence Corps and the Civil Constructional Corps.

Building
After WWI he returned to work as a carpenter and, later, a builder, eventually living and working at Avenel in country Victoria. The Depression brought him and his family back to Melbourne,  where he took on whatever work he could find (including repairing broken window glass), and eventually settled in Ivanhoe. Working on a house in Heidelberg in 1934-35, he volunteered to build a stone wall for its landscape designer Edna Walling. Impressed by his natural aptitude she employed him again on many other jobs as he gradually established his own practice as a constructor and designer  of gardens.

Landscape architecture
Stones collaborated for many years with Edna Walling, constructing many of the rock outcrops, walls and ponds in the gardens she designed. 
Among the gardens in which he did rock work for Walling were:
 the Donaldson, Anderson and Marshall gardens in Heidelberg
 the Beattie, Darling and Anderson gardens in Toorak 
 the Lewis garden in Malvern
 'Kildrummie', the Carnegie garden in Holbrook, New South Wales
 the 'Hillsborough' or 'Silver Birches' garden in Balwyn
 gardens in Benalla, Skipton and Olinda

In Australian Home Beautiful of December 1938 Walling wrote:
 
"It is a rare thing this gift for placing stones and strange that a man possessing it should bear the name Stones... Lovely as formal gardens can be, it is these informal schemes, in which boulders form so important a part, that appeal so tremendously... they give us the atmosphere of the country, and the refreshment of mind derived from such".

Stones' inspiration for garden landscaping came from the natural world. He writes in the introduction to his book Australian Landscape Design,

" ... more can be learnt by observing nature than through any other form of teaching. When you see pleasing contours with perhaps an attractive grouping of trees, ask yourself why they please you. It may be their texture or perhaps their shape, or a wandering track which may give special interest to the landscape. Look for the reason. It may be that the track winds around a tree which casts shadows on the path, or past an outcrop of boulders."

In her foreword to The Ellis Stones Garden Book published in 1976 shortly after his death, Thistle Harris elaborates

"Ellis Stones abhorred geometrical patterns as much as does nature on a grand scale, and straight paths, trimmed borders and serried ranks of plants are never to be found in his gardens. Curving paths leading to forever; informal clumps of plants, bending intimately towards each other; lichen-covered rocks of geological antiquity—these things distinguish his designs."

The second principle which guided Stones' work was the idea that gardens must be designed for the people who use them. This struck a chord with writer Anne Latreille as she researched his life and work for her book ‘The Natural Garden’ (1990). She noted how he would start by considering the owners' way of life including likely changing needs over time. He tried to include private, sheltered spaces to sit outdoors. And he was cognisant of providing beautiful outlooks from indoors as well as particular spots in the garden.

In addition to creating many hundreds of gardens throughout Melbourne, through his writings (for instance as an occasional then regular contributor to Australian Home Beautiful and later with his books), Stones must have influenced hundreds of thousands of home gardeners. His 1950s plant nursery in Lower Heidelberg Road helped to make native plants more available to the general public, and allowed him to provide brief advice to a large number of customers who had admired his work in others' gardens or who read his articles but could not afford to engage him.

Stones' specific advice on the design of home gardens has been distilled as follows:

 "Think of a courtyard as a room without a ceiling.
 Use timber for its beauty as well as its utility.
 No garden is too small to have water in it.
 When placing rocks, bury more underground than you will see above ground.
 A garden should always have a sitting spot."

His employees also recall him frequently commenting, "when in doubt, plant spiraea!"

Stones inspired a whole generation of younger garden designers. He was a foundation lecturer in the landscape design course at RMIT.  His employees Bob Grant and David Leech went on to develop successful landscape businesses. Leech practised in Far North Queensland but his work lives on in beautiful parks and gardens in the Eltham area. NSW landscaper designer Michael Bligh's career in design was prompted by coming across Stones' book while looking for something to read on his way home on the train.  While not formally trained himself, Stones supported the establishment of the Australian Institute of Landscape Architects, becoming one of its first affiliate members, and receiving a fellowship in 1975. Among others, he trained landscape designer, Bev Hanson and pioneer of the bush garden concept, Gordon Ford. Ford's influence lives on into the 21st century through the work of his former employee, contemporary landscape architect, Sam Cox.  Stones was also a major influence on John Fenton, one of Australia's foremost ecological farmers.

Commissions

As noted, over his long and busy working life, Stones was involved in creating several hundred gardens around Melbourne and beyond. Beginning with smaller specific elements such as rock outcrops and pools (especially for Edna Walling) his body of work includes the following:

Other commissions included a garden in Balwyn for Alan Blazey, chairman of garden products firm Hortico in the mid-1950s, a garden in Strathmore and playgrounds and gardens at Invercargill in New Zealand.

Association with Merchant Builders; the Elliston Estate
Merchant Builders Pty Ltd was an initiative of Melbourne businessman David Yencken. After discussions with prominent Melbourne architect Robin Boyd and his young employee Graeme Gunn, Yencken (with timber merchant John Ridge) established the company with the vision of providing architect-designed houses at project home prices. Graeme Gunn was architect-in-charge, and Ellis Stones – then aged 71 – took on its landscape and garden design.Eventually Merchant Builders  assembled a team of architects to design 50 basic house plans.
The architects consulted included:
 Charles Duncan
 Daryl Jackson and Evan Walker
 McGlashan Everist
 Graeme Gunn

Ellis Stones was commissioned to undertake landscaping in many of the Merchant home developments.

Elliston Estate was one of the best-known Merchant Builders home developments, named after Ellis Stones himself. Swamped by protests from local residents when the Rosanna Golf Club was to be subdivided for housing, Heidelberg City Council agreed to buy the golf course, retain half of it for a park and sell the rest to Merchant Builders for on-selling to the public. Ellis Stones advised on landscaping the park and developing the streetscapes and gardens so that 'gardens streets and park' would 'flow into and through each other'.  Elliston includes the following streets:
Bachli, Cremin, Ferrier, Pickworth, Hartley, Nagle and Devlin Courts; Stanton, Crampton, Phillips and Von Nida Crescents; the west side of Finlayson Street; and Thompson Drive (all in Rosanna).

Environmentalism
Ellis Stones was deeply concerned about the destruction of the Australian landscape. In the introduction to his book Australian Garden Design, published in 1971, he writes
"Before the commencement of any major project that encroaches on the landscape there should be formed a panel consisting of persons representing every profession concerned with the project, to discuss and advise on the best means of carrying out the project with the least damage to the landscape. A landscape architect should certainly be included in any such panel, as he is in other countries which are deeply concerned about the preservation of their natural flora and fauna." 
He goes on to say, "The ideal way to design a garden is in consultation with the architect or builder, before operations have commenced, so that the building may be sited in a way that will give plenty of scope for the garden, preserve some of the existing trees if the area is a wooded one, or emphasise any other strong features that may be evident in the natural contours."

Stones had a major influence on the landscaping of public places in Australia.  In 1964 he assisted the Blackburn Tree Preservation Society to develop a proposal for staggered planting of clumps of Australian plants both within the median strip and either side of Springvale Road. The Nunawading Council, though initially resistant to the proposal, was eventually persuaded. Newsletters from the Society document that planting undertaken in 1965 in a trial stretch from Whitehorse Road to Canterbury Road was later extended south to Waverley Road. In 1974, Stones designed a section of the median strip in Canterbury Road from east of View Road, Vermont to the intersection of Boronia and Mitcham Roads. This landscape project used rock outcrops and low bluestone walls and is still visible when driving west along Canterbury Road before the intersection with Mitcham and Boronia Roads. The retention and supplementation of native vegetation championed by Stones and the Blackburn Tree Preservation Society has become the norm for median strips and roadside planting throughout Victoria.

Stones was an outspoken critic of the Melbourne Metropolitan Board of Works (MMBW), lamenting the destruction and degradation of the Yarra River environs and creeks throughout suburban Melbourne. He was the first president of the Ivanhoe River Parklands Protection League established in 1955 to prevent the destruction of Chelsworth Park. He served as a committee member for the Save the Yarra League and also assisted the Yarra Valley Freeway Action Group. For the Tullamarine Freeway he wrote to Lord Mayor Ron Walker late in 1974 suggesting "the whole length... as a beautiful bushland setting, with the statuesque river red gums a main feature... to welcome visitors to Australia."

The very last job undertaken by Ellis Stones, in 1975, was landscaping Salt Creek in the Rosanna Parklands, a job approved by his former adversary the MMBW. As Anne Latreille describes it 
"Peter Glass visited Ellis on site the day before he died and found him 'leaping around those rocks like an antelope'.  He came home for dinner on the night of 9 April, tired and happy. 'Oh I've had a good day' he said to (wife) Olive. 'There's a boy on the job who really understands what I'm talking about.' He went for a short lie-down before the evening meal and did not wake. He died in harness, quickly and quietly, as he wished it."  
Not long after his death, the MMBW preserved a large amount of land along the Yarra Valley in a series of metropolitan parks, landscaped with native vegetation exactly as he would have wanted.

Awards and recognition
Stones posthumously received the Royal Australian Institute of Architect's Robin Boyd environmental medal.

A memorial plaque honouring his work can be found in a rock garden in Chelsworth Park near his former home in Ivanhoe.

The rock garden he designed near the staff car park at The University of Melbourne bears another memorial plaque.

The Ellis Stones rockery in Burnley Gardens was created to honour his contribution to landscape design in Australia.

The Ellis Stones Memorial Award is offered biennially to a landscape student for an outstanding piece of research.

Books
 Stones, Ellis, 1971, Australian Garden Design, South Melbourne, with photographs by Ted Rotherham
 Stones, Ellis, 1976,   The Ellis Stones Garden Book, Nelson Australia, West Melbourne 
 Stones, Ellis, unpublished manuscript "Priority Landscaping Latreille, Anne, 1990, The Natural Garden – Ellis Stones: His Life and Work, Penguin Australia, Ringwood, Melbourne
 Latreille, Anne, 2013, Garden Voices Australian Designers – their stories, Bloomings Books, Melbourne, Australia
 Saniga, Andrew 2012, Making Landscape Architecture in Australia, UNSW Press, Sydney
 Vale, Anne, 2013, Exceptional Australian Garden Makers Lothian, Middle Park, Melbourne

Peer reviewed academic literature
 Dr Andrew Saniga, University of Melbourne http://www.findanexpert.unimelb.edu.au/display/publication258502#time

References

Additional newspaper articles
About war experience

 McMullin, R. Gallipoli’s three musketeers went off to war ... only one returned. Life section, The Australian, 25 April 2015

About gardening
 Alston, P.Making the most of your space Gardening, The Age, 3 December 1976, p 27
 Blog posting Iconic Australian Landscape Architects – Ellis Stones, in Grass Trees and Butterfly Chairs, 13 September 2012
A fertile field for green fingers (article mentioning Como garden and promoting gardening apprenticeships) Monday Job Market, The Age, 28 March 1988, p24
 Kerr Forsyth, H =en Garden edging can make life neater and easier Executive Living, The Australian, 28 March 2015

About garden heritage
 Latreille, A. Magic of a garden, Environs, The Age, 13 October 1976

About environmentalism
 Colebatch, T. 'Pocket' park plan urged. City's wasteland can be transformed so cheaply - expert, The Age, 5 December 1974, p10
 Stones, E., Letter to the editor. Restaurant in Botanic gardens (Ellis objects) The Age, 16 December 1968, p4
 Latreille, A. Plan for Valley: Landscaping scheme proposed. Living in Melbourne, The Age, 12 February 1975
 Wilson, G. Planners should go native Weekender, 'The Age', 20 May 1977, p16
 Colebatch, T. Boom returning for Toorak of the North Environs, The Age, 4 February 1974, p22
 Stevens, J. Action speaks louder than words (concerning report of the Valley Freeway Action Group), ND Column 'The Age', 23 March 1976

About playgrounds
Building backlog could be ended. 'Children doing landscaping to plan of Ellis Stones', The Age, 13 January 1975
 Dexter, N. Highrise quality of life Accent, The Age, 4 June 1970, p17

About Elliston
 Chisholm, J. Unorthodox Elliston: 50 Acres of natural parkland 20 November 1969
 Buhrich, E 'Planned for enjoyment' 'The Sydney Morning Herald', 18 June 1970, p13

Recognition, obituaries and honours
 Dexter, N. Working with nature Accent, The Age, 3 April 1970, p11
Our leading landscape planner dies, The Age, 7 April 1975
University chair may honor architect Home news, The Age, 9 April 1975, p 4
Robin Boyd Environmental Award 1975 Home News, The Age, 22 October 1975, p2
 Barker, J. Three-story design is house of the year Houses and Property, 'The Age', 27 October 1975, p13
 Honor for Ellis Stones Home news, The Age, 28 October 1976, p4
 Latreille, A. Ellis Stones Appeal, Environs, Accent, The Age, 3 November 1976, p26

Legacy
 Guest, S. We need to create a true Australian style Spring/Summer Gardening, The Age, 17 October 1989, p24

Newspaper advertisements mentioning Stones
 Stones, E. Newspaper advertisement for Stones' 'Garden Art' business, The Argus, 16 July 1945
The Good Life for sale, advertisement for houses for sale in Winter Park, Doncaster'The Age' 23 December 1972 p27
 Davie, R. Merchant Builders' house popular, editorial and advertisement for houses in Merchant Builders' Winter Park], Real estate, The Age, 7 November 1975, pp25–6
 Advertorial concerning house for sale in Merchant Builders' Elliston estate, The Age'', 26 August 1981, p34

External links

Quotes
War record
Biographical note, National Library of Australia Trove
Biographical note, Australian National Herbarium
Ellis Stones, National Portrait Gallery
Heritage citation, Elliston estate
Books on ebay
Books indexed on google
Google scholar

1975 deaths
1895 births
Australian landscape architects
Australian military personnel of World War I
People from Wodonga
Volunteer Defence Corps soldiers
20th-century Australian architects
People from Essendon, Victoria
Military personnel from Melbourne
Australian conservationists